Tillandsia ariza-juliae, the wand airplant, is a species in the genus Tillandsia. It is native to the Dominican Republic and Puerto Rico.

Cultivars
 Tillandsia 'Pruinariza'

References

ariza-juliae
Flora of the Dominican Republic
Flora of Puerto Rico
Plants described in 1959